Sally Jean Gray MBE (born June 1968) is a Scottish television presenter.

Life and career

Education and early career 
Gray earned a BA Degree in Communication and Media Studies from Queen Margaret University in Edinburgh. After graduation Gray began to work behind the scenes at the BBC, and soon after, entered a BBC Journalism course. On this course Gray researched for programmes such as Question Time, Public Eye and Newsroom South East. In 2001, Gray participated in the celebrity special in the fourth season of Fort Boyard alongside Nell McAndrew, Tris Payne, Scott Wright and Keith Duffy. Gray also presented the pilot episode of Channel 4's Scrapheap Challenge.

Television presenting 
Gray began presenting television as a reporter on GMTV. Gray then moved on to lifestyle shows such as ITV's Moving Day in 2004 and Our House, BBC's Real Rooms and The Really Useful Show. Gray presented How to Find a Husband... and What to do if You Can't for UKTV Style in 2006.
Since 2007, Gray runs a company called Presenters Inc, with Jonas Hurst, specializing in TV Presenter Training.

Children's television 
As a CBBC entertainment presenter Gray presented shows including 50/50 between 1997 and 2002 and the multi-award-winning It'll Never Work? from 1993 to 1999, and Record Breakers among others.

Honours and charity work 
In 2003, Gray was awarded an MBE for Services to Young People though her work as an Ambassador for the Millennium Volunteers. Gray is also an Ambassador for The Prince's Trust. In 2005, she was voted 44th of Scotland on Sunday's 50 Most Eligible Women and in 2006 Gray was ranked 19th.

Personal life 
Gray has been married since August 2009 and has two children.

References

External links 
 

Living people
1968 births
People from Paisley, Renfrewshire
GMTV presenters and reporters
Scottish television presenters
Scottish women television presenters
Members of the Order of the British Empire
Alumni of Queen Margaret University